Kampung Ayer is a prominent traditional settlement in Bandar Seri Begawan, the capital of Brunei. It comprises neighbourhoods of traditional houses, schools and mosques built on stilts above the Brunei River near the capital's city centre. It has been historically nicknamed 'Venice of the East'. Kampung Ayer has been historically the principal settlement of Brunei; it was the de facto capital, in particular social and economic centre, of the Bruneian Empire for a few centuries, but also extending into the early period during British imperialism in Brunei.

Name 
The present name 'Kampung Ayer' is the obsolete romanised spelling of the Malay term '', which literally means 'Water Village'. However, the old spelling version is retained and still used as the primary name of the place.

History
Kampong Ayer is believed to have been inhabited for several centuries. There are several historical records, particularly foreign sources, which reported the existence of 'water settlements' on the Brunei River. The most well known is arguably the account by Antonio Pigafetta, an Italian explorer, on his visit to Brunei as part of the Magellan fleet in 1521, in which he described the settlement as

There is a possibility that the stilt settlement might not have always been where it is today, that Kampong Ayer might have undergone relocation throughout history. Olivier van Noort, a Dutch, on his stay in Brunei from December 1600 to January 1601, described the houses (of the nobles) as

The stilt settlement of what we know today as Kampong Ayer had always been the primary settlement area of the de facto capital of the Bruneian Empire for centuries. However, the role also extended into the time from the arrival, and subsequent imperial presence of the British even until the early 20th century. It was only during the Residential period that a programme which encouraged the Kampong Ayer residents to resettle on land began to be introduced, although it was initially unsuccessful but eventually took off, resulting in significant reduction to its population. Nevertheless, substantial number of residents still remain to live on water. Kampong Ayer also survived bombardments during World War II.

Administration 

Kampong Ayer encompasses six mukims and several administrative villages:

The mukims and villages are also part of the municipal area of Bandar Seri Begawan.

Infrastructures 

Houses in Kampong Ayer are built on stilts above the water. They are traditionally made of wood and adopt the style of traditional Malay houses. The houses may be up to two-storey high. Majority are built privately, thus may have individual style, whereas some which have been built under the public housing initiatives (notably those in Kampong Bolkiah and the houses under the pilot rejuvenation project in Kampong Lurong Sikuna) have a more uniform style akin to housing estates on land.

Kampong Ayer has an extensive network of walkways on stilts and pedestrian bridges connecting the houses and other buildings. They are built of wood, concrete or with metal stilts. For neighbourhoods without connecting walkways due to being separated by wide waterways, mobility is done by motorboats. The boats are usually made of wood and in traditional local style, but installed with engines. The boats may also transport passengers between the land and the neighbourhoods not on the riverbanks.

Common utilities may include electricity, pipe water, telephone lines, internet access and television services. As of 2017, fixed wireless has been made available with the speed of up to 100Mbps. It has been implemented to eliminate the difficulty of house-to-house installation and overcome frequent internet cable theft.

Educational institutions are available in Kampong Ayer which provide public education comprising primary, primary religious and secondary. There are at least a primary school in each . Similarly, religious schools can also be found, which provide primary religious education to the resident Muslim pupils. The secondary school in Kampong Ayer, Awang Semaun Secondary School, is the only school of its kind where its buildings are built on water. Nevertheless, Sayyidina Umar Al-Khattab Secondary School, which is built on land, also has catchment area in some villages of Kampong Ayer.

Other public facilities include mosques, police stations and fire departments. Fire cases are common in Kampong Ayer, in which the reported main causes include faulty wiring and susceptibility of the buildings to fire due to many being built of wood.

Challenges

Survival 
As a major historical and cultural heritage of Brunei, there has been increasing concern on the survival of Kampong Ayer in modern times. This is factored by the emigration and relocation of the inhabitants to land. Over the last few decades, the overall population has been shrinking, estimated to have decreased from about 28,000 in 1981 to 13,000 in 2011. The diminishing population, added with the busy modern lifestyle, are threatening the survival of the customs and traditions practiced in Kampong Ayer. It also weakens the sense of community among the residents.

Waste 
The floating of rubbish and sewage on the waters of Kampong Ayer is a persisting issue despite substantial measures and initiatives taken by various government and non-government agencies. It is acknowledged that the sources of the problem are not simply from within Kampong Ayer but may also due to ineffective waste management on land, specifically in the vicinity of upstream tributaries and streams of the Brunei River, in which Kampong Ayer lay along its downstream flow. Measures have been implemented by the government which include upgrading and installation of sewage treatment works in the catchment areas, as well as installation of rubbish collection system in the villages of Kampong Ayer. However, complete success is still yet to be seen. Systematic sewage disposal in Kampong Ayer itself is only feasible on public housing villages, namely Bolkiah 'A', Bolkiah 'B' and Sungai Bunga, where they have organised residential layout, where as in the traditional villages, which constitute the majority of Kampong Ayer areas, such disposal system is still not yet available.

Non-government organisations also play significant roles in combatting this issue. Together with the government, as well as the general public, in particular the Kampong Ayer residents, multiple cleaning campaigns have been conducted. Awareness programmes to the public on the importance of waste management have also been carried out for many years. Again, the effectiveness of such programmes have yet to completely yield the desired results.

Notable people 

 Jamil Al-Sufri (1921–2021), historian and former director of Brunei History Centre.
 Abdul Aziz Juned (born 1941), state mufti.
 Abu Bakar Apong (born 1948), politician and minister.
 Adnan Yusof (born 1952), politician and minister.
 Abdullah Bakar (born 1951), politician and minister.
 Yahya Bakar (born 1954), politician and minister.
 Abdul Rahman Ibrahim (born 1954), politician and minister.
 Badaruddin Othman (born 1942), politician and minister.
 Hazair Abdullah (born 1953), politician and minister.
 Abdul Wahab Juned (born 1949), politician and minister.

Notes

References

External links 
 
 

Populated places in Brunei
Bandar Seri Begawan